Statistics of Allsvenskan in season 1957/1958.

Overview
The league was contested by 12 teams, with IFK Göteborg winning the championship. This season began in the summer of 1957, but didn't finish until the autumn of 1958.  In this unusually long season, the teams met each other three times instead of twice, resulting in a season consisting of 33 rounds instead of 22. For this reason, it was referred to as the "Marathon Allsvenskan".

League table

Results

Rounds 1–22

Rounds 23–33

Footnotes

References 

Allsvenskan seasons
1957–58 in Swedish association football leagues
Sweden